The 1960 Giro d'Italia was the 43rd running of the Giro d'Italia, one of cycling's Grand Tour races. The Giro started in Rome, on 19 May, with a  stage and concluded in Milan, on 9 June, with a  leg. A total of 140 riders from 14 teams entered the 21-stage race, which was won by Frenchman Jacques Anquetil of the Helyett team. The second and third places were taken by Italian Gastone Nencini and Luxembourgian Charly Gaul, respectively.

Teams

Fourteen teams were invited by the race organizers to participate in the 1960 edition of the Giro d'Italia. Each team sent a squad of ten riders, which meant that the race started with a peloton of 140 cyclists. From the riders that began the race, 97 made it to the finish in Florence.

The teams entering the race were:

Route and stages

The race route was revealed on 13 April 1960. The start of the race was moved to Rome to honor the Summer Olympics to be held in the city later that year. Before the race began in Rome, the organizers honored the race's first organizer , five-time Giro champion Fausto Coppi, and journalist , all of whom died before the race started in 1960. President Giovanni Gronchi officially opened the race.

Classification leadership

One jersey was worn during the 1960 Giro d'Italia. The leader of the general classification – calculated by adding the stage finish times of each rider – wore a pink jersey. This classification is the most important of the race, and its winner is considered as the winner of the Giro.

The mountains classification leader. The climbs were ranked in first and second categories. In this ranking, points were won by reaching the summit of a climb ahead of other cyclists. There were three categories of mountains. The first category awarded 80, 60, 40, 30, and 20 points, while the second distributed 60, 40, and 20 points. Although no jersey was awarded, there was also one classification for the teams, in which the teams were awarded points for their rider's performance during the stages.

Final standings

General classification

Mountains classification

Intermediate sprints classification

Team classification

References

Citations

 
1960
Giro d'Italia
Giro d'Italia
Giro d'Italia
Giro d'Italia